This article lists the performances of each of the 50 national teams which have made at least one appearance in the IHF World Women's Handball Championship finals.

Debut of teams
Each successive World Women's Handball Championship has had at least one team appearing for the first time. Teams in parentheses are considered successor teams by IHF.

Participation details
Legend
 – Champions
 – Runners-up
 – Third place
 – Fourth place
5th – Fifth place
6th – Sixth place
7th – Seventh place
8th – Eighth place
9th – Ninth place
10th – Tenth place
11th – Eleventh place
12th – Twelfth place
MR – Main round
GS – Group stage
Q – Qualified for upcoming tournament
 – Qualified but withdrew
 – Did not qualify
 – Did not enter / Withdrew from the World Championship / Banned
 – Hosts

For each tournament, the number of teams in each finals tournament (in brackets) are shown.

Results of host nations

Results of defending champions

References

World Handball Championship tournaments